The 1957 NBA playoffs was the postseason tournament of the National Basketball Association's 1956-57 season. The tournament concluded with the Eastern Division champion Boston Celtics defeating the Western Division champion St. Louis Hawks 4 games to 3 in the NBA Finals.

It was the first title in Celtics history; as of 2020, they are tied with the Los Angeles Lakers in NBA titles won with 17.

The Celtics and Hawks met in 4 out of 5 NBA Finals from 1957–1961, with the Celtics winning 3 out of 4. While the Hawks' dominance of the Western Division was succeeded by the Los Angeles Lakers afterward, Boston missed the NBA Finals just once between 1957–1969, and won the NBA title in every year but two.

In the division semifinals, the Philadelphia Warriors were swept by the Syracuse Nationals 2–0. This was the first time in NBA history that the defending champions were swept in the opening round. The next time the defending champions were swept in the opening round was in 2007. It was also the only time in which the playoff series leading to the Final resulted in sweeps.

Bracket

Division Tiebreakers

Western Division Tiebreakers

Fort Wayne Pistons @ St. Louis Hawks

Minneapolis Lakers @ St. Louis Hawks

Division Semifinals

Eastern Division Semifinals

(2) Syracuse Nationals vs. (3) Philadelphia Warriors

This was the fifth playoff meeting between these two teams, with the 76ers/Nationals winning three of the first four meetings.

Western Division Semifinals

(2) Minneapolis Lakers vs. (3) Fort Wayne Pistons

This was the fifth playoff meeting between these two teams, with the Lakers winning three of the first four meetings.

Division Finals

Eastern Division Finals

(1) Boston Celtics vs. (2) Syracuse Nationals

This was the sixth playoff meeting between these two teams, with the Nationals winning four of the first five meetings.

Western Division Finals

(1) St. Louis Hawks vs. (2) Minneapolis Lakers

This was the second playoff meeting between these two teams, with the Hawks winning the first meeting.

NBA Finals: (E1) Boston Celtics vs. (W1) St. Louis Hawks

 Tom Heinsohn hits the game-tying lay-up with 6 seconds left in regulation to force the first OT; Bob Cousy hits the game-tying shot with 15 seconds left in the first OT to force the second OT.

 Bob Pettit hits the game-winner with 45 seconds left.

 Cliff Hagan hits the game-winner at the buzzer.

 Bob Pettit hits the game-tying free throws with 7 seconds left in regulation to force the first OT; Jack Coleman makers the game-tying basket with 9 seconds left in the first OT to force the second OT. Bob Pettit misses the game-tying shot at the buzzer to force a third OT.
 Only NBA Finals Game 7 to date to go past the first overtime, and as of 2021, the only Game 7 in NBA history to go past the first overtime.

This was the first playoff meeting between these two teams.

References

External links
Basketball-Reference.com's 1957 NBA Playoffs page

National Basketball Association playoffs
Playoffs